L'insegnante al mare con tutta la classe (The teacher at the beach with the whole class) is a 1980 Italian commedia sexy all'italiana directed by Michele Massimo Tarantini.

Cast 
 Anna Maria Rizzoli: prof. Lisa Colombi
 Lino Banfi: commendator Ercole Cubetti
 Francesca Romana Coluzzi: Enrichetta Cubetti
 Marco Gelardini: Mario Cubetti
 Alvaro Vitali: Cocò
 Franco Diogene: Paolo
 Gisella Sofio:  wife of Paolo

References

External links

1980 films
Commedia sexy all'italiana
1980s sex comedy films
Films directed by Michele Massimo Tarantini
Italian high school films
1980 comedy films
1980s Italian-language films
1980s Italian films